Rossiya Tournament 1980 was played in Syktyvkar on 1-5 February 1980. The Soviet Union won the tournament.

The tournament was decided by round-robin results like a group stage. Norway was invited but chose not to come. Instead, a team for Komi ASSR was set up to fill out the field.

Results

Sources 
 Norges herrlandskamper i bandy 
 Sverige-Sovjet i bandy 
 Rossija Tournament 

1980 in Soviet sport
1980 in bandy
1980